Bocus is a genus of Southeast Asian jumping spiders that was first described by George Peckham & Elizabeth Peckham in 1892. , it contains only three species, which are found only in the Philippines and Indonesia: B. angusticollis, B. excelsus, and B. philippinensis. They are indistinguishable from the related genus Myrmarachne without the help of a microscope.

References

External links
 Salticidae.org: Diagnostic drawings and photographs with mimicked ant species

Salticidae genera
Salticidae
Spiders of Asia